Barry Shipman (February 24, 1912 – August 12, 1994) was a Canadian-American screenwriter. He was the son of the Canadian film pioneers Ernest Shipman and Nell Shipman. He worked on more than a hundred films and television series, mainly of the western and mystery film genres. He was married to the actress Gwynne Shipman, with whom they had a daughter Nina Shipman who also became an actress.

Selected filmography

 Shakedown (1936)
 Hi-Yo Silver (1940)
 Roaring Rangers (1946)
 Singin' Spurs (1948)
 Song of Idaho (1948)
 Laramie (1949)
 The Blazing Trail (1949)
 Horsemen of the Sierras (1949)
 The Kid from Amarillo (1951)
Bonanza Town (1951)
 Pecos River (1951)
Montana Territory (1952)
Laramie Mountains (1952)
 Smoky Canyon (1952)
 Junction City (1952)
 Lay That Rifle Down (1955)
 Stranger at My Door (1956)

References

Bibliography
 Morris, Peter. Embattled Shadows: A History of Canadian Cinema, 1895-1939. McGill-Queen's Press, 1992.

External links

1912 births
1994 deaths
20th-century American screenwriters
Shipman family